Coolin' is an album by the Prestige All Stars nominally led by vibraphonist Teddy Charles recorded in 1957 and released on the Prestige label.

Reception

Allmusic reviewed the album stating "The group plays five originals by bandmembers that often have complex melodies but familiar chord changes. ...This obscure session is an excellent outing".

Track listing 
 "Staggers" (Mal Waldron) – 7:52
 "Song of a Star" (John Jenkins) – 7:11
 "The Eagle Flies" (Idrees Sulieman) – 7:38 		
 "Bunni" (Teddy Charles) – 8:02
 "Reiteration" (Waldron) – 7:56 		
 "Everything Happens to Me" (Matt Dennis, Tom Adair) – 4:33

Personnel 
Teddy Charles – vibraphone
Idrees Sulieman – trumpet
John Jenkins – alto saxophone (tracks 1-5)
Mal Waldron – piano
Addison Farmer – bass
Jerry Segal – drums

Production
Teddy Charles  – supervisor
Rudy Van Gelder – engineer

References 

Teddy Charles albums
1959 albums
New Jazz Records albums
Albums recorded at Van Gelder Studio